Hamza Doublali (born 31 January 1960) is a Moroccan judoka. He competed in the men's middleweight event at the 1984 Summer Olympics.

References

External links
 

1960 births
Living people
Moroccan male judoka
Olympic judoka of Morocco
Judoka at the 1984 Summer Olympics
Place of birth missing (living people)
20th-century Moroccan people
21st-century Moroccan people